Philip Laats (born 2 February 1963) is a Belgian  who competed at the international and world level in the Japanese martial art of Judo, including at the 1996 Summer Olympic games in Atlanta, Georgia.

Achievements

References

1963 births
Living people
Belgian male judoka
Judoka at the 1984 Summer Olympics
Judoka at the 1988 Summer Olympics
Judoka at the 1992 Summer Olympics
Judoka at the 1996 Summer Olympics
Olympic judoka of Belgium
20th-century Belgian people
21st-century Belgian people